James Brett Blanton is an American professional engineer who served as Architect of the Capitol (AOC) from January 2020 until February 13, 2023 overseeing the office of the Architect of the Capitol and its more than 2,400 employees. 

Blanton was terminated from his position after an inspector general's report found "administrative, ethical and policy violations" by Blanton, including allegations that he misused his government vehicle and misrepresented himself as a law enforcement official.

Education and career 
Blanton earned his Master of Science from Virginia Tech in Ocean Engineering and his Bachelor of Science  in Aerospace, Aeronautical and Astronautical Engineering from the United States Naval Academy in 1993. Blanton  is a Licensed Professional Engineer in Civil Engineering and a Certified Energy Manager.

Blanton served in the Navy Civil Engineer Corps for 22 years. He retired from the Navy in 2015. He then served as Deputy Vice President for Engineering at the Metropolitan Washington Airports Authority which operates the Reagan National and Dulles International Airports.

Architect of the Capitol 
President Donald Trump nominated Blanton on December 9, 2019, for a ten-year term as Architect of the Capitol. On December 12, 2019, the Senate Committee on Rules and Administration held a hearing on his nomination. On December 16, 2019, the Committee reported his nomination favorably to the Senate floor. On December 19, 2019, the full Senate confirmed his nomination by voice vote. He was sworn in on January 16, 2020.

The Architect of the Capitol is responsible for the maintenance, operation, development, and preservation of the United States Capitol Complex.

Misuse of office 
In November 2022, a report from the office of the Inspector General found that Blanton and his family had repeatedly misused the resources of his office. The investigation was prompted by a tip about Blanton's daughter recklessly driving an AOC Ford Explorer at a Walmart in Tyson's Corner. Multiple instances of the Blanton family misusing government cars for personal use were documented in the report, which also documented how Blanton's wife gave unauthorized tours of the U.S. Capitol and that Blanton misrepresented himself as a police officer.

As a result, the Consolidated Appropriations Act, 2023, an omnibus spending bill, included a clause in the AOC budget "That none of the funds appropriated or made available under this heading in this Act or any other Act, including previous Acts, may be used for a home-to-work vehicle for the Architect or a duly authorized designee". Congressional representatives called for Blanton to resign. On February 13, 2023, President Joe Biden terminated Blanton's appointment as Architect of the Capitol.

Awards 
 Bronze Star with Combat “V”

References 

Architects of the United States Capitol
Living people
Year of birth missing (living people)
Virginia Tech alumni
United States Naval Academy alumni